TAR EC College, abbreviated as TAR EC, is a non-profit, private early childhood education college in Malaysia, registered with Ministry of Higher Education (MOHE). It is located in Setapak, Kuala Lumpur, adjacent to Tunku Abdul Rahman University College Kuala Lumpur Main Campus. 

The institute was established in 1993 and was the only private and non-profit institution of higher learning, concentrating solely on pre-school teachers’ training in Malaysia. 

Over the past 19 years, more than 2,500 pre-school teachers have graduated from the institute. On 1 November 2015, TAR EC College signs a Memorandum of Understanding (MOU) with National Pingtung University (NPTU), Taiwan to allow graduates from early childhood education further studies in this university.

The institute also have partnership with professional bodies such as Early Childhood Care and Education Council and Association of Professional Early Childhood Educators Malaysia.

Mission & Aim

Mission 
TAR EC College focuses on child advocacy in three dimensions:
 Enabling every child regardless of background, to have access to quality education - made possible when the teacher is trained and qualified;
 Quality early childhood education is on the right pedagogy; and
 Right pedagogy implies the right methodology.

Aim
TAR EC College aims to raise the professional standard of early childhood practitioners and to ensure that our educators are trained and qualified professionals with:
 Strong knowledge based on the child, including appropriate learning experiences, assessment and evaluation;
 Skills and competencies to relate to children; and
 Attitude and interest in the development of early childhood education

Programmes
TAR EC College currently have following programmes:
Diploma in Early Childhood Education
Diploma in Early Childhood Special Education
Basic Child Care Course or Kursus Asuhan dan Didikan Kanak-Kanak PERMATA (KAP) - Accredited by the Jabatan Kebajikan Masyarakat Malaysia (JKMM) from the Ministry of Women, Family and Community Development to conduct this course in accordance with the Childcare Centers Act 1984, Regulations 41 & Regulations (Institutional) 1985

Partner Institution
 Malaysia
Universiti Tunku Abdul Rahman
Quest International University Perak
 Taiwan
National Pingtung University
 United Kingdom
University College Birmingham
University of Gloucestershire

References

External links
 Official TAR EC College Website
 Universiti Tunku Abdul Rahman (Partner Institution)

Colleges in Malaysia
Early childhood educational organizations
Educational institutions established in 1993
Universities and colleges in Kuala Lumpur
1993 establishments in Malaysia